Euphaedra laboureana, the brownish Themis forester, is a butterfly in the family Nymphalidae. It is found in Guinea, Sierra Leone, Liberia, Ivory Coast, and Ghana.

The larvae feed on Deinbollia pinnata.

Subspecies
Euphaedra laboureana laboureana (eastern Guinea, northern Sierra Leone)
Euphaedra laboureana bernaudi Hecq, 1996 (Cameroon)
Euphaedra laboureana eburnensis Hecq, 1979 (north-eastern Guinea, southern Sierra Leone, Liberia, Ivory Coast, Ghana)

References

Butterflies described in 1957
laboureana